Buslaev is a Russian male surname, its feminine counterpart is Buslaeva. Notable people with the surname include:

Fyodor Buslaev (1818–1898), Russian philologist, art historian, and folklorist
Vladimir Buslaev (1937–2012), Russian mathematical physicist